The following is a list of Brahmaeidae of Nepal. Only two different species are known.

This list is primarily based on Colin Smith's 2010 "Lepidoptera of Nepal", which is based on Toshiro Haruta's "Moths of Nepal (Vol. 1-6)" with some recent additions and a modernized classification. 

Brahmaea hearseyi
Brahmaea wallichii

See also
List of butterflies of Nepal
Odonata of Nepal
Cerambycidae of Nepal
Wildlife of Nepal

References

 01
Brahmaeidae
Insects of Nepal